Stolen Kisses is a 1968 French romantic comedy-drama film directed by François Truffaut.

Stolen Kisses may also refer to:
 Stolen Kisses (1929 film), an American comedy film
 Stolen Kisses (2008 film), an Egyptian film
 Stolen Kisses (Dawson's Creek)